Kizz My Black Azz is the debut EP by rapper MC Ren, released on June 30, 1992, on Ruthless Records and distributed by Priority Records. Selling over one million copies in the first month, to date, the album has sold 2.2 million copies in the U.S.

Release and reception

Track listing

Personnel
 Bobby Ervin – producer
 Brian Gardner – mastering
 Dean Karr – photography
 Clarence Lars – producer
 Dino Paredes – art direction, design
 Lorenzo Patterson – main artist, producer
 Mike Sims – bass, guitar
 Donovan Smith – mixing
 Eric Wright – executive producer
 The Torture Chamber – producers

Charts

Weekly charts

Year-end charts

Certifications

References

MC Ren albums
1992 debut EPs
Ruthless Records EPs
Priority Records EPs